The MRT Kajang Line, previously known as the Sungai Buloh–Kajang Line (SBK Line), is a Mass Rapid Transit (MRT) line servicing the Klang Valley, Malaysia. It is the second fully automated and driverless rail system in the Klang Valley region after the LRT Kelana Jaya Line. Owned by MRT Corp and operated as part of the RapidKL system by Rapid Rail, it forms part of the Klang Valley Integrated Transit System. The line is numbered 9 and coloured green on official transit maps.

It is one of three planned mass rapid transit (MRT) rail lines under Klang Valley Mass Rapid Transit Project by MRT Corp. Phase 2 operations between Muzium Negara and Kajang was opened on 17 July 2017, as a free shuttle service, by former Malaysian Prime Minister, Dato' Seri Najib Tun Razak in a ceremony at the Tun Razak Exchange station. Full revenue service between Sungai Buloh and Kajang began the following day.

History

Initial LRT proposal
In August 2006, the LRT Kota Damansara–Cheras line proposal was first made known to the public by the then deputy Prime Minister, Datuk Seri Najib Tun Razak under a RM10 billion government allocation for the improvement and expansion of the public transportation network in the Klang Valley as a new light rapid transit (LRT) system. The line is also targeted to alleviate traffic congestion in the Klang Valley by encouraging more commuters to opt for public transport. It is also aimed to reduce overcrowding on the KL Monorail and to provide an alternative transport mode due to rising fuel prices. It is estimated to be approximately 30 km in length. This is planned in-line with the extension of the LRT Kelana Jaya Line and the LRT Sri Petaling Line, to Subang Jaya and Puchong respectively and converging at Putra Heights. The combined cost of the new line and the proposed extensions were estimated at RM7 billion. Syarikat Prasarana Nasional Berhad (SPNB) was in charge of the construction of these lines. The line was planned to be served by 140 coaches, and the track gauge to be almost similar to existing LRT lines. The Ministry of Transport had approved the alignment of the new line in July 2007 which would then be tabled to the Cabinet for approval. The Finance Ministry's Parliamentary Secretary announced that the line from Kota Damansara to Cheras and Balakong would be completed by 2012. The line would be 40 km long, serving densely populated areas in Damansara and Cheras via "The Golden Triangle" of Kuala Lumpur city. The alignment was to be from Persiaran Surian to the Balakong Interchange on the Cheras-Kajang Expressway, passing through the Damansara-Puchong Expressway (LDP), Sprint Highway, the city, Jalan Tun Razak and Jalan Cheras, stopping at around 30 stations. Ownership of the line belonged to SPNB, and would be operated by Rapid Rail. The estimated construction cost is between RM4 billion and RM5 billion.

In September 2008, Executive Director of SPNB said that a 5.9 km section of the line in central Kuala Lumpur will be underground, serving 5 stations. However, the locations of underground stations were not announced. It was during this time that the line was said to be 42 km with 32 stations in total, which would serve areas of Bandar Utama, Bangsar, KL Sentral, Bukit Bintang, Bandar Tasik Selatan and Cheras. The line was being considered for as a Mass Rapid Transit (MRT) system after taking into consideration the catchment area serving a population of 878,000. It was also reported that the detailed design stage for the line would commence in the second quarter of 2009 and the opening date is expected to be in 2014.

New alignment and conversion to MRT
On 14 September 2009, SPNB managing director Datuk Idrose Mohamed was reported as saying that the new line could end up longer than the earlier announced alignment although he did not offer any further details. A public display of the alignment was launched a day after the announcement. SPNB has raised the necessary funds from Islamic investments of RM2 billion and hopes to gain approval from the Ministry of Transport to call out for tenders. In April 2010, a proposal to extend the line by 16 km was being studied by the government. The proposal includes extensions from Kota Damansara to Sungai Buloh (additional 3 km) and from Cheras to Kajang (additional 9 km). This is to provide convenient interchanges to the existing Keretapi Tanah Melayu (KTM) stations at Sungai Buloh and Kajang, as well as supporting the upcoming development of some 3000–acre land in Sungai Buloh. An additional branch line from Damansara Utama to Kelana Jaya (additional 4 km) aimed to relieve congestion on the LDP Highway was also being studied, bringing the total length of the line to 59 km.

Unofficial statements in 2009 claimed that the proposed line was changed to an MRT line. In June 2010, during the tabling of the 10th Malaysia Plan,  Prime Minister Najib Tun Razak announced that the government was now considering a RM36 billion Klang Valley MRT proposal from Gamuda Berhad and MMC Corporation Berhad, which is the largest national infrastructure project. The proposal includes 3 lines, including one which is similar to the Kota Damansara—Cheras proposal. The MRT lines were to be mostly underground with stations 500m to 1 km apart in areas with high demand. The concept was envisioned to be inspired by Singapore's Mass Rapid Transit (MRT) system. The project, aimed to improve public transport in the Klang Valley, was approved by the Malaysian cabinet on 17 December 2010 and construction of the first line from Sungai Buloh to Kajang would begin in July 2011 with a duration of five to six years. Gross national income from these future lines is between RM3 bil and RM12 bil. The government had appointed MMC-Gamuda JV Sdn Bhd as Project Delivery Partner where it would play the role project manager, supervised by the Land Public Transport Commission (SPAD). The whole project would be divided into nine parcels in which will be done on open tender basis. 10 km of the line would be underground and the remaining 50 km above ground with 35 new stations. MMC-Gamuda would be barred from bidding for any tender except for tunnelling works (the most expensive portion). Ownership of the lines would be given to SPNB.

To seek for further consultation from the public, SPAD held a 3-month public display of the alignment of the MRT Kajang Line. On 8 July 2011, Razak officially launched the project. The final alignment was adjusted following the public display, having a length of 51 km with 31 stations where 16 have Park and Ride facilities. Construction was said to be completed in December 2016 and the line would start operations a month after. On 17 August 2011, the government announced that Mass Rapid Transit Corporation Sdn Bhd (MRT Corp), a new company under the Finance Ministry had been formed to take control of the project from Prasarana. MRT Corp would be the asset owner of the project and officially take over the project from Prasarana on 1 September 2011. After the MRT project was formally launched on 8 July 2011, the following amendments have been made to the original proposed alignment following the public display exercise between March and May 2011:
 31 stations instead of 35 stations will be built and provisions have been made for 3 more stations
 Construction of Taman Mesra station has been shelved.
 The proposed Section 17 station was dropped
 The location of the proposed TTDI station was moved around 300m southwards to the former Caltex petrol stations. This was due to complaints from Taman Tun Dr Ismail and Damansara Kim residents.
 Bukit Bintang East and West stations have been combined into one, moved and integrated with KL Monorail station. The station was named Bukit Bintang Central Station and subsequently Bukit Bintang Station.
 Park and Ride facilities has been increased to 16 from 13 previously.
 Adjustments to the alignment:
 Shifting alignment into the former Rubber Research Institute of Malaysia land in Sungai Buloh to cater for future development
 Adjusting the alignment adjacent to Bandar Kajang station to avoid going through the town centre and through Kajang Stadium.

Contract allocation
On 21 October 2011, MRT Corp shortlisted 5 companies to construct the underground parts of the line including MMC Gamuda Joint Venture and Sinohydro Group. On 26 January 2012, MRT Corp announced the award of the first two civil works contracts for the construction of the MRT Kajang line. IJM Construction Sdn Bhd was appointed the contractor for Package V5 at a tender price of RM974 million, while Ahmad Zaki Sdn Bhd was appointed the contractor for Package V6 at a tender price of RM764 million. Package V5 is from the Maluri portal to Plaza Phoenix (now Taman Connaught) station while Package V6 covers the section between Plaza Phoenix and Bandar Tun Hussein Onn stations. MRT Corp announced the pre-qualification of 28 companies to bid for six System Works Packages for the MRT line on 8 March 2012. Subsequently, in September 2012, another 31 companies were pre-qualified to bid for the remaining five System Works Packages.

Construction

All stations are to be equipped with platform screen doors, where this contract was awarded to the Singaporean company Singapore Technology Electronics Ltd. 33kV Main Switching Substations are to be constructed at 4 stations, namely Taman Industri Sungai Buloh (now Kwasa Sentral), Section 16 (now Phileo Damansara), Taman Cuepacs (now Sri Raya) and Kajang stations. The other 3 substations are added at the Cochrane launch shaft, Sungai Buloh depot and Semantan portal. Two more 132/33kV Transmission Main Intakes are constructed at Cochrane Launch shaft and Semantan portal. Tenaga Nasional Berhad (TNB) agreed to supply 116.5MW of power on the Kajang Line which costs RM173.1 million.

On 1 November 2011, the 70's Klang bus stand ceased operations and was demolished to make way for the underground platforms and new entrances of Pasar Seni station. When construction of the station is completed, a new bus hub will be reconstructed. On 1 August 2012, MRT Corp announced that the project was in active construction phase. MRT Corp said that the project cost would not exceed the limit of RM23 billion. The first section between Sungai Buloh and Semantan was expected to open in December 2016, with the entire line opening in July 2017.

On 30 May 2013, tunnel excavation works for the Kajang Line began with the world's first Variable Density Tunnel Boring Machine (VDTBM). This TBM was jointly designed by MMC Gamuda KVMRT Tunnelling and Herrenknecht AG, a German company. Commencement of tunnelling works was launched by former Malaysian Prime Minister Najib Tun Razak at the Cochrane Launch Shaft, which would later become the Cochrane MRT station. The shaft is 30 m deep and this TBM was to dig a distance of 1.2 km towards Pasar Rakyat (now Tun Razak Exchange) station. 10 TBMs were used to construct the 9.5 km tunnelled section of the line, where 6 are Variable Density and 4 are Earth Pressure Balance TBMs. The tunnels are to have a diameter of 6 m, where the first breakthrough of the TBM excavations occurred on 25 December 2013.

Opening
On 2 September 2016, Prime Minister Najib Tun Razak took a surprise visit on the MRT line. He took a return trip from Semantan station to Phileo Damansara station in which he visited the latter.

On 16 December 2016, Phase 1 of the Kajang Line which spans 23 km from opened between Sungai Buloh to Semantan.

The fare of this part of the line and its feeder bus routes was free of charge until 16 January 2017. Two days later, MRT Corp confirms cost of 51 km of Kajang Line would be RM21 billion. On 17 July 2017, Phase Two of the line from Semantan to Kajang began operations.

The line is operated by a subsidiary of Prasarana Malaysia, Rapid Rail, which already operates the Ampang Line, Sri Petaling Line, Kelana Jaya Line and KL Monorail.

Overview

Route 

The MRT line covers a span of 47 kilometres from Kwasa Damansara to Kajang, passing the Kuala Lumpur city centre where the alignment goes underground. The line serves a corridor with 1.2 million residents within the Klang Valley region from the northwest to the southeast of Kuala Lumpur. The line starts from Kwasa Damansara which is located to the northwest of Kuala Lumpur, and runs on an elevated guideway to the Semantan portal, passing through Kota Damansara, Bandar Utama, Seksyen 17 Petaling Jaya, Phileo Damansara and Damansara Town Centre. Kwasa Damansara provides a cross-platform interchange between the MRT Kajang Line and the MRT Putrajaya Line. The line continues in twin-bore tunnels underground to the Maluri portal, passing through the city centre and the Golden Triangle of Kuala Lumpur. Interchanges to other lines are provided from Muzium Negara to Maluri with the exception of Cochrane station in Kuala Lumpur. Beyond Taman Pertama, the line passes through Cheras and ends in Kajang via an elevated guideway.

Station designs 

For the seven underground stations, the overall inspiration was from the Klang Gates Quartz Ridge, a pure quartz dyke found in the Klang Valley which has multi-faceted characteristics and has kaleidoscopic reflections. These features resemble Malaysia's multi-racial, multi-cultural and progressive society. The concept is used in the designs of the different murals in the underground stations.  is fitted with tiles that depict the transition of the city's mode of public transport while  is "painted" with 'Y's, which represents the convergence of the Klang and Gombak rivers.  has the Rukun Negara sculpted on the walls of the concourse.  has designs of blue and grey motives representing a modern Islamic Corporate theme.  features harmonious red and yellow colours while  has vibrant red patterns.  is filled with bright green, blue and yellow tiles which symbolises urban renewal.

All stations are wheelchair accessible, with lifts and escalators serving each platform. All platforms are equipped with platform screen doors.

List of stations

Services and rolling stock 

According to MRT Corp, the four-car train sets are servicing the line with an average headway of 3.5 minutes in an hour, equivalent to 400,000 passengers per day.

The rolling stock is manufactured by Siemens/CSR Nanjing Puzhen in a partnership with SMH Rail Consortium Sdn Bhd. The trains will be driverless with a capacity of 1,200 passengers in a 4-car trainsets formation. The Siemens Inspiro rolling stock will be supplied with the same configuration as the trainsets supplied for Warsaw Metro M1.

 29 June 2014: The first two train car bodies arrived in Westport, Port Klang, Selangor. The train will be assembled in the country's first train assembly plant in Rasa, Hulu Selangor. The purpose built plant for the KVMRT project is solely owned and operated by SMH Rail Sdn Bhd. SMH Rail had a consortium partnership with Siemens AG and Siemens Malaysia. Work to assemble the trains began immediately after the first two train car bodies arrived in Westport. The time taken to assemble one train set is about 30 days. The plant has two assembly lines, allowing work on four trains sets to be carried out at the same time.
 30 November 2014: Another 14 train car bodies had arrived.

Car length (over coupler): 22.89 m (end car), 22.2 m (intermediate car)

Number of passenger doors per car side / door width: 4 / 1400 mm

Traction power supply: 750 V DC, third rail

The 4-car trainsets are maintained at 2 purpose built facilities, Sungai Buloh and Kajang depots, located nearby  and  stations respectively.

Approximately 42 trains are required during peak hour operations.

Formation
The train consist of four cars, with cars 1 towards Kajang and cars 2 towards Kwasa Damansara.

All trainsets data are as follows (updated February 2023):
27 active, 16 inactive, 15 decommissioned or dormant for over a year

Ridership

In the second quarter of 2018, the quarterly ridership is a little short of 12 million, following an overall rising trend. However, the line is deemed to have inadequate ridership to cover the construction, operation and maintenance costs. A target of 250,000 daily passengers is required for the line to break even with its operation costs.

Depots

There are two maintenance depots for the Kajang Line, namely the Sungai Buloh depot and Kajang depots. The former is accessible by trains to the north of Kwasa Damansara station, while the latter is located near Sungai Jernih, where trains access the depot from Bukit Dukung instead.

See also 
 Prasarana Malaysia Berhad
 Rapid Bus Sdn Bhd
 Rapid KL
 Rapid Penang
 Rapid Kuantan
 Rapid Rail Sdn Bhd
 Rapid KL
 Rapid Ferry Sdn Bhd
 MRT Corp
 Klang Valley Mass Rapid Transit Project
 MyHSR Corp
 Kuala Lumpur–Singapore High Speed Rail Project
 Public transport in Kuala Lumpur
 Rail transport in Malaysia

Notes and references

Notes

References

External links 
 Mass Rapid Transit Corporation Sdn Bhd (MRT Corp)
 Prasarana Malaysia Berhad
 Suruhanjaya Pengangkutan Awam Darat (SPAD)
 MRT tunneling works by MMC-Gamuda
 Route Map
 MRT Website

Transport in the Klang Valley
Passenger rail transport in Malaysia
Railway lines opened in 2016
2016 establishments in Malaysia